Lomatium stebbinsii, known by the common name Stebbins' desertparsley, is a rare species of flowering plant in the carrot family.

Distribution
The plant is endemic to the central−western Sierra Nevada in California. It is known only from the slopes near the border of Calaveras and Tuolumne Counties, within the Stanislaus National Forest.

It is a plant of chaparral and lower montane coniferous forest habitats.

Description
There is generally no stem, the leaves and inflorescence emerging at ground level. The sparse leaves are shiny green and hairless. Each has leaf blades divided into linear leaflets.

The inflorescence is a small umbel of yellow flowers.

Conservation
The California Native Plant Society lists the plant as a critically endangered species.

References

External links
Calflora Database: Lomatium stebbinsii (Stebbins' desertparsley,  Stebbins's lomatium)
Jepson Manual eFlora (TJM2) treatment of Lomatium stebbinsii
USDA Plants Profile for Lomatium stebbinsii (Stebbins' desertparsley)
UC Photos gallery — Lomatium stebbinsii

stebbinsii
Endemic flora of California
Flora of the Sierra Nevada (United States)
Natural history of the California chaparral and woodlands
Natural history of Calaveras County, California
Natural history of Tuolumne County, California
Stanislaus National Forest
Plants described in 1979
Taxa named by Lincoln Constance
Critically endangered flora of California